Dawn Song is a Chinese American academic and is a professor at the University of California, Berkeley, in the Electrical Engineering and Computer Science Department.

She received a MacArthur Foundation Fellowship in 2010.

Education 
Song earned her B.S. (1996) from Tsinghua University, her M.S. (1999) from Carnegie Mellon University, and her Ph.D. (2002) from the University of California, Berkeley.

Career 
Song became an assistant professor at Carnegie Mellon University (2002–2007) before joining the faculty at the University of California, Berkeley in 2007.

Song's work focuses on computer security, machine learning, and blockchains.

Song is the Founder of Oasis Labs. At UC Berkeley, Song is the co-Director of the campus-wide center: Berkeley Center for Responsible Decentralized Intelligence (RDI).

Recognition
Song is the recipient of numerous awards, including a Sloan Fellowship, an NSF CAREER Award, the IBM Faculty Award, a Guggenheim fellowship, and a MacArthur Foundation Fellowship. In 2009, the MIT Technology Review TR35 named Song as one of the top 35 innovators in The World under the age of 35.
She was elected as an ACM Fellow in 2019 "for contributions to security and privacy".

References

External links
"Dawn Song", DBLP

Living people
Carnegie Mellon University alumni
Carnegie Mellon University faculty
University of California, Berkeley alumni
UC Berkeley College of Engineering faculty
MacArthur Fellows
Fellows of the Association for Computing Machinery
Santa Fe Institute people
Year of birth missing (living people)